Harold Stanley Ede (7 April 1895 – 15 March 1990), also known as Jim Ede, was a British collector of art and friend to artists.

Life and career

Jim Ede was born in Penarth, Wales, the son of solicitor Edward Hornby Ede and Mildred, a teacher.

Ede studied painting under Stanhope Forbes at Newlyn Art School between 1912 and 1914. He was commissioned in September 1914 during the First World War, serving with the South Wales Borderers and the Indian Army. He relinquished his commission in consequence of ill health, and was granted the rank of captain, 29 July 1919.

After the war, he continued his studies at the Slade School of Art. In 1921, Ede became assistant curator at the National Gallery of British Art (later the Tate Gallery) in London whilst continuing to study part-time at the Slade. Shortly after, he married Helen Schlapp whom he had met in Edinburgh. Whilst working at the Tate, he tried to promote the work of contemporary artists, including Picasso and Mondrian. However, he was often thwarted by the more conservative attitudes of the gallery directors. During his time at the Tate, Ede formed numerous friendships with avant-garde artists of the day. In the process, he acquired many works of art that were largely under-appreciated at the time. In particular, he secured much of the work of Henri Gaudier-Brzeska from the estate of Sophie Brzeska. The collection included numerous letters sent between Henri and Sophie, and Ede used these as the basis for his book Savage Messiah on the life and work of Gaudier-Brzeska, which in turn became the basis of Ken Russell's film of the same name.

Middle years
In 1936, Ede tired of fighting the establishment at the Tate and left to live in Morocco, building a house outside Tangiers. Somewhat ahead of his time, he adopted a minimalist style of interior design advocating plain white-washed walls and the minimum of furniture required to complete a room. For the next twenty years, he led an itinerant life, writing, broadcasting and lecturing in Europe and America, whilst keeping the house in Morocco as a base.

Artistic legacy

Returning to England in 1956, Ede converted four cottages in Cambridge as a place to live and display his art collection. It was part of his philosophy that art should be shared in a relaxed environment; to this end he would hold 'open house', giving personal tours of the collection to students from the University of Cambridge over afternoon tea. Students could also borrow paintings from his collection to hang in their rooms during term-time. In 1966, Ede gave the house and collection to the university, establishing Kettle's Yard art gallery.

Ede continued to live at Kettle's Yard until 1973, and then moved to Edinburgh where he lived out his retirement.

Publications 
 Savage Messiah, H.S. Ede, Heinemann (1931) — Biography of the sculptor Henri Gaudier-Brzeska. Reprinted, Kettle's Yard Gallery (1971), .
Savage Messiah: a biography of the sculptor Henri Gaudier-Brzeska; with new texts by Sebastiano Barassi, Evelyn Silber and Jon Wood. Leeds: Henry Moore Institute, 2011  
 A Way of Life, H. S. Ede, Kettle's Yard Gallery, . Guide to Kettle's Yard and its collection.
 Kettle's Yard and its Artists, ed. Michael Harrison, Cambridge 2009

See also
Savage Messiah

References

External links

Jim Ede's timeline on the Kettle Yard website

1895 births
1990 deaths
Alumni of the Slade School of Fine Art
English art collectors
English philanthropists
English curators
Museum founders
People associated with the University of Cambridge
British Army personnel of World War I
South Wales Borderers officers
People from Penarth
Chevaliers of the Légion d'honneur
Indian Army personnel of World War I